Oxycanus australis is a moth of the family Hepialidae. It is found in South Australia, Tasmania and Victoria.

The larvae possibly feed on Leptospermum laevigatum.

References

Moths described in 1856
Hepialidae
Endemic fauna of Australia